Seputar iNews (Around iNews, taken from the term Seputar Indonesia and iNews) is an Indonesian flagship news programme which broadcast on RCTI, replacing Seputar Indonesia which aired from 1990 to 2017. The program broadcast for three to four hours each day through Seputar iNews Pagi (breakfast news), Seputar iNews Siang (lunchtime news), Sekilas iNews (headline news), and Breaking iNews (breaking news, different coverage with iNews).

See also 
 Buletin iNews
 Lintas iNews

References 

Indonesian television news shows
Indonesian-language television shows
2017 Indonesian television series debuts
2010s Indonesian television series
RCTI original programming